Allison Shelby Lipsher (born January 24, 1986) is an American soccer coach and former player who played as a goalkeeper. Lipsher is currently the goalkeeper coach of Kansas City in the National Women's Soccer League (NWSL).

References

External links
 Atlanta Beat player profile
 Duke player profile

1986 births
Living people
Duke Blue Devils women's soccer players
Boston Breakers players
Newcastle Jets FC (A-League Women) players
Atlanta Beat (WPS) players
Sydney FC (A-League Women) players
Women's Professional Soccer players
A-League Women players
American women's soccer players
Women's association football goalkeepers
21st-century American women
Kansas City Current non-playing staff
American expatriate women's soccer players
Expatriate women's soccer players in Australia
American expatriate sportspeople in Australia
Soccer players from Hawaii
Sportspeople from Honolulu
Cocoa Expos players
Ajax America Women players
Association football goalkeeping coaches